Central Square may refer to:

Tampere Central Square, Finland
Central Square, Chennai, India
Central Square (Tolyatti), Russia
Central Square, Cardiff, Wales, UK
Central Square, Cambridge, Massachusetts, U.S.
Central Square Theater
Central Square, East Boston, Massachusetts, U.S.
Central Square, New York, U.S.
Central Square School District
Central Square Airport, now Syracuse Suburban Airport

See also

Central Square Historic District (disambiguation)